Cerdic is described in the Anglo-Saxon Chronicle as a leader of the Anglo-Saxon settlement of Britain, being the founder and first king of Saxon Wessex, reigning from 519 to 534 AD. Subsequent kings of Wessex were each claimed by the Chronicle to descend in some manner from Cerdic. His origin, ethnicity, and even his very existence have been extensively disputed. However, though claimed as the founder of Wessex by later West Saxon kings, he would have been known to contemporaries as king of the Gewissae, a folk or tribal group. The first king of the Gewissae to call himself 'King of the West Saxons', was Caedwalla, in a charter of 686.

Etymology
The name Cerdic is thought by most scholars to be Brittonic – a form of the name Ceretic – rather than Germanic in origin. According to the Brittonic origin hypothesis, Cerdic is derived from the British name *Caratīcos or Corotīcos. This may indicate that Cerdic was a native Briton, and that his dynasty became Anglicised over time. This view is supported by the potentially non-Germanic names of some of his descendants including Ceawlin, Cedda and Caedwalla.

Background

The Anglo-Saxon Chronicle provides a pedigree tracing Cerdic's ancestry back to Wōden and the antediluvian patriarchs. Kenneth Sisam has shown that this pedigree was constructed by borrowing and subsequently modifying a pedigree tracing the ancestry of the kings of Bernicia, and hence before the generation of Cerdic himself the Wessex pedigree has no historical basis. The pedigree gives Cerdic's father as Elesa, who has been identified by some scholars with the Romano-Briton Elasius, the "chief of the region", met by Germanus of Auxerre.

J. N. L. Myres noted that when Cerdic and Cynric first appear in the Anglo-Saxon Chronicle in s.a. 495 they are described as ealdormen, which at that point in time was a fairly junior rank. Myres remarks that:

Furthermore, it is not until s.a. 519 that Cerdic and Cynric are recorded as "beginning to reign", suggesting that they ceased being dependent vassals or ealdormen and became independent kings in their own right.

Summing up, Myres believed that:

King of Wessex 

According to the Anglo-Saxon Chronicle, Cerdic landed in what is today Hampshire in 495 with his son Cynric in five ships. He is said to have fought a Brittonic king named Natanleod at Natanleaga and killed him 13 years later (in 508) and to have fought at Cerdicesleag in 519. Natanleaga is commonly identified as Netley Marsh in Hampshire and Cerdicesleag as Charford (Cerdic's Ford). The conquest of the Isle of Wight is mentioned among his campaigns, and it later was given to his kinsmen Stuf and Wihtgar (who supposedly arrived with the West Saxons in 514). Cerdic is said by the Anglo-Saxon Chronicle to have died in 534, succeeded by his son Cynric.

The early history of Wessex in the Chronicle has been considered unreliable, with duplicate reports of events and seemingly contradictory information. David Dumville has suggested that Cerdic's true regnal dates are 538–554. Some scholars suggest that Cerdic was the Saxon leader defeated by the Britons at the Battle of Mount Badon, probably fought in 490 (and possibly later, but not later than 518). This cannot be the case if Dumville is correct, and others assign this battle to Ælle or another Saxon leader, so it appears likely that the origins of the kingdom of Wessex are more complex than the version provided by the surviving traditions.

Some scholars have gone so far as to suggest that Cerdic is purely a legendary figure, but this is a minority view. The Anglo-Saxon Chronicle, the earliest source for Cerdic, was put together in the late ninth century; though it probably does record the extant tradition of the founding of Wessex, the intervening 400 years mean that the account cannot be assumed to be accurate. The annals of the Anglo-Saxon Chronicle, along with the genealogical descents embedded in that source's accounts of later kings, describe Cerdic's succession by his son Cynric. However, the Genealogical Regnal List that served as preface to the Chronicle manuscripts instead interposes a generation between them, indicating that Cerdic was father of Creoda and grandfather of Cynric.

Descent from Cerdic became a necessary qualification for later kings of Wessex, and he was claimed ancestor of Ecgberht, King of Wessex, progenitor of the English royal house and subsequent rulers of England and Britain.

See also 
House of Wessex family tree

References

External links 
 
 
 The Anglo-Saxon Chronicle which says he and his son arrived in Hampshire, at Cerdices Ore (Cerdic's Point)

5th-century births
534 deaths
Year of birth unknown
6th-century English people
6th-century English monarchs
Arthurian legend
English heroic legends
Anglo-Saxon warriors
Founding monarchs
Sub-Roman monarchs
West Saxon monarchs
House of Wessex